Jesse Lewis Baker (July 10, 1957 – January 16, 1999) was an American football defensive end in the National Football League for the Houston Oilers and the Dallas Cowboys.

Baker played high school football for the Rockdale County High School Bulldogs in Conyers, Georgia in 1973 and 1974, where he earned all-state first-team honors both years. He was also a stand-out in track and field. He played college football at Jacksonville State University (JSU); while he was there, he was defensive MVP of the 1977 Grantland Rice Bowl, and was inducted to the JSU Hall of Fame in 1989. Baker was drafted in the second round of the 1979 NFL Draft.

Baker played nine seasons in the NFL with the Oilers.  He recorded 15.5 quarterback sacks and returned a fumble for a touchdown in his rookie season in 1979, despite starting only two of 16 games.  He recorded 6.5 sacks in 1980 and 10 more in 1981 as a part-timer before becoming a starter in the strike shortened 1982 season.  Baker started 57 consecutive games and recorded 29.5 more sacks.

References

1957 births
1999 deaths
People from Conyers, Georgia
Sportspeople from the Atlanta metropolitan area
Players of American football from Georgia (U.S. state)
American football defensive ends
Jacksonville State Gamecocks football players
Houston Oilers players
Dallas Cowboys players
National Football League replacement players